Jean-Yves Kerjean (born 25 June 1958 in Ploudalmézeau) is a French retired football coach and footballer who is last known to have managed Stade Brestois B in his home country.

South Africa

Given the Orlando Pirates head coach post in 2001 after several negotiations, Kerjean was obstinate about his system of promoting young talents near the end of the year and guided the Bucs to third-place in the league and a 3–0 triumph over Kaizer Chiefs in the Soweto Derby. However, he was discharged from his post in summer 2002 following poor results and the failure of his young talent system. After a stop in Dubai, Kerjean was announced as head coach of Black Leopards in 2005, aiming for a top eight finish before being dismissed a month later.

Reflecting on his stay in South Africa, the French mentor claimed that safety was an issue and that he had to be accompanied by bodyguards.

He applied to coach a few South African clubs in 2010.

References

External links 
 CFA2. Ecommoy ? Stade Brestois (B) (3-6) Jean-Yves Kerjean : « On a survolé le match »

1958 births
Living people
Sportspeople from Finistère
Footballers from Brittany
Association football defenders
French footballers
Stade Rennais F.C. players
Dijon FCO players
Olympique de Marseille players
FC Istres players
Vannes OC players
Ligue 1 players
Ligue 2 players
French football managers
French expatriate football managers
Expatriate soccer managers in South Africa
French expatriate sportspeople in South Africa
Expatriate football managers in Algeria
French expatriate sportspeople in Algeria
FC Annecy managers
Limoges FC managers
Orlando Pirates F.C. managers
Black Leopards F.C. managers
Premier Soccer League managers